Fly Air was a private airline based in Istanbul, Turkey. Originally a charter airline, it also operated scheduled services.

The airline ceased operations in January 2007.

History 
Fly Air was established in 2002 out of the defunct carrier Air Anatolia and operated holiday charter flights. In October 2003, the airline started offering scheduled services. Fly Air was the first charter airline in Turkey with domestic flights. The first domestic flight gained a lot of media coverage as the monopoly of Turkish Airlines was broken. Fly Air ceased operations after financial problems in 2007.

Destinations 
Fly Air operated the following services until it ceased operations:

Domestic scheduled destinations: Ankara, Antalya, Istanbul, İzmir, Northern Cyprus, Bodrum, Trabzon, Urfa and Mardin
International scheduled destinations: Europe (Netherlands, Belgium, Germany, France, Switzerland, Spain, Italy, Poland), Tel Aviv, Yerevan, Khartoum, Tunis and Egypt.

References

External links 

Fly Air

Airlines established in 2002
Airlines disestablished in 2007
Defunct airlines of Turkey
2002 establishments in Turkey